David Alan Robertson (born April 9, 1985), nicknamed D-Rob, is an American professional baseball pitcher for the New York Mets of Major League Baseball (MLB). He has previously played in MLB for the New York Yankees, Chicago White Sox, Tampa Bay Rays, Chicago Cubs, and Philadelphia Phillies.

Robertson played college baseball for the Alabama Crimson Tide. He was drafted by the Yankees in the 17th round of the 2006 MLB draft and made his MLB debut with the Yankees in 2008. Robertson was a member of the Yankees team that won the 2009 World Series. He was named an MLB All-Star in 2011. After Mariano Rivera retired, Robertson served as the Yankees' closer in 2014. He signed with the White Sox as a free agent after the 2014 season and was traded back to the Yankees in July 2017. Robertson signed with the Phillies as a free agent after the 2018 season.

Amateur career
Robertson was born in Birmingham, Alabama, and played his first three years of high school baseball at Central-Tuscaloosa High School in Tuscaloosa, Alabama. He was a two-year starter for the Falcons at shortstop and pitcher. He helped lead his team to back-to-back area titles, as well as back-to-back 6A State Playoff appearances. After his junior year, Central High School was split into three smaller high schools, and Robertson attended Paul W. Bryant High School in Tuscaloosa, graduating in 2004. He led the Stampede to an area title and the Class 6A State Playoffs in the school's first year of existence.

Robertson enrolled at the University of Alabama and played college baseball for the Alabama Crimson Tide. As a freshman in 2005, Robertson appeared in a team-high 32 games with three games started. He compiled a 7–5 win–loss record with eight saves and a 2.92 earned run average (ERA), and set the single-season rookie record for most strikeouts (105). He led the Southeastern Conference (SEC) by limiting hitters to a .183 batting average. He was named Freshman All-SEC and Freshman All-American by Baseball America, Louisville Slugger Freshman All-American, and Collegiate Baseball Magazine Freshman All-American.

In his sophomore season, Robertson helped lead the Crimson Tide to their 25th SEC Championship. He appeared in 29 games, compiling a 4–4 record with a 3.02 ERA. He led the SEC with 10 saves. In 2006, he played collegiate summer baseball in the Cape Cod Baseball League for the Yarmouth-Dennis Red Sox and was named the Most Valuable Player of the playoffs in Yarmouth-Dennis' championship season.

Minor leagues
Due to Robertson being 21 at the time of the 2006 MLB draft, he was a draft-eligible sophomore and the New York Yankees selected him in the 17th round. He signed with the Yankees for a $200,000 signing bonus.

In 2007, pitching for the Charleston RiverDogs of the Class A South Atlantic League, the Tampa Yankees of the Class A-Advanced Florida State League, and the Trenton Thunder of the Class AA Eastern League, he was a combined 8–3 with four saves and an 0.96 ERA in  innings, allowing 45 hits while striking out 114 batters, averaging 12.1 strikeouts per nine innings. Robertson was a 2007 mid-season South Atlantic League All Star. He was third among minor league relievers, with a .154 opponents batting average.

In 2008, pitching for Trenton and the Scranton/Wilkes-Barre Yankees of the Triple-A International League, he was 4–0 with three saves and a 1.68 ERA in  innings, allowing 28 hits while striking out 77, averaging 12.9 strikeouts per nine innings. He was named the International League's "Best Reliever" of 2008 in Baseball America's Best Tools survey. Pitching for Scranton/Wilkes-Barre in 2009, he was 0–3 with two saves and a 1.84 ERA with 25 strikeouts in  innings, averaging 15.3 strikeouts per nine innings. In 2012 he pitched two scoreless innings for Scranton/Wilkes-Barre.

Major leagues

New York Yankees (2008–2014)

2008–2011

On June 28, 2008, the Yankees called Robertson up from Scranton/Wilkes-Barre. On August 28, the Yankees optioned him back to Scranton/Wilkes-Barre with a 6.31 ERA. He was recalled back to the MLB on September 13. He appeared in 25 MLB games in 2008, going 4–0 with a save and a 5.34 ERA, and 51 strikeouts in 34 innings, averaging 13.1 strikeouts per nine innings.

After starting the 2009 regular season in Triple-A, Robertson was recalled to the MLB on April 16, to replace Xavier Nady, who had been placed on the 15-day disabled list. The next day he was optioned back to Triple-A to open a roster spot for Juan Miranda. On May 25, he was again recalled to the MLB, to replace reliever Brian Bruney. Robertson finished the season 2–1 with a save and a 3.30 ERA and 63 strikeouts in  innings, averaging 13.0 strikeouts per nine innings (among pitchers with at least 40 innings pitched, the second-best ratio in the MLB behind Jonathan Broxton (13.50)).

In the 2009 playoffs, Robertson entered two games in high-pressure situations with multiple runners on base, once in the ALDS and once in the ALCS, and did not allow any runs to score. Robertson received the win in each of those games. The Yankees won the 2009 World Series over the Philadelphia Phillies.

Robertson finished the 2010 season with a 4–5 record, one save, a 3.82 ERA, and 71 strikeouts in  innings, averaging 10.4 strikeouts per nine innings.

In Game 6 of the 2010 ALCS against the Texas Rangers, Robertson relieved Phil Hughes in the fifth inning and surrendered a two-run home run to Nelson Cruz which gave the Rangers a 5–1 lead; the Rangers would win the game 6–1 to take the AL pennant.

The Yankees entered the 2011 season with the additions of relief pitchers Pedro Feliciano and Rafael Soriano. Robertson lost out to Joba Chamberlain to be the seventh inning specialist whom manager Joe Girardi wanted to bridge to Soriano and closer Mariano Rivera. Injuries to Feliciano, Soriano, and Chamberlain put Robertson in the eighth inning setup role, where he had 55 strikeouts halfway through the season. Robertson was named to the 2011 American League All-Star roster, replacing David Price.

Robertson finished his breakout 2011 season 4–0 with a save, 34 holds (tied for the AL lead), leading the league in ERA (1.08), along with a 13.5 strikeouts per nine innings ratio (second in the AL, and the highest ratio by a Yankee reliever in franchise history), and an MLB-leading adjusted ERA+ of 410, in 70 games pitched (fifth in the AL). He finished the season with 100 strikeouts (leading all AL relievers) in  innings, becoming the first Yankee reliever since Rivera (in 1996) to record 100 strikeouts in a single season. He struck out the 300th batter of his career in  career innings on June 24, making him the third-fastest pitcher in major league history to reach that mark after Billy Wagner and Brad Lidge. He received one point in the voting for both the AL Cy Young Award (the only non-starter or non-closer to receive a vote) and AL Most Valuable Player (MVP) Award (the only reliever to receive a vote). Robertson also won the This Year in Baseball Setup Man of the Year Award.

2012–2014
In January 2012, the Yankees and Robertson agreed on a one-year non-guaranteed contract to avoid arbitration.

When Rivera went down with a season-ending injury in May 2012, Girardi announced that Robertson and Soriano would share the duties of closing games for the remainder of the season. Robertson himself was placed on the 15-day disabled list however on May 15, after he strained a muscle in his rib cage, 12 days after Rivera's season-ending injury. He returned to action on June 15, but after several appearances became the setup man for Soriano. Robertson finished the 2012 season with a record of 2–7, a 2.67 ERA, two saves, and 30 holds (tied for third in the AL) in 65 games, with 81 strikeouts in  innings, averaging 12.0 strikeouts per nine innings.

In 2013, Robertson served as the eighth inning setup reliever behind Rivera. He appeared in 70 games, going 5–1 with three saves and 33 holds (second in the AL) and a 2.04 ERA and 77 strikeouts in  innings, averaging 10.4 strikeouts per nine innings.

Rivera retired after the 2013 season. During spring training in 2014, Robertson was named the Yankees' closer. On April 7, Robertson was placed on the 15-day disabled list due to a groin strain.

Robertson had a 4–5 record and a 3.08 ERA in 2014, was successful on 39 (third in the AL) out of 44 save attempts, and struck out 96 batters in  innings, averaging 13.4 strikeouts per nine innings. In his lone season as Yankees' closer, Robertson garnered praise as a worthy successor to Rivera. He was paid $5.215 million in 2014. On November 10, Robertson declined the Yankees' $15.3-million qualifying offer for the 2015 season, making him a free agent.

Chicago White Sox (2015–2017)

After the 2014 season, Robertson became a free agent. He subsequently agreed to a four-year, $46 million contract with the Chicago White Sox. Robertson served as the White Sox closer during his tenure in Chicago. In his first season with the White Sox, Robertson compiled a 6–5 record with 34 saves (sixth in the AL), a 3.41 ERA, and 86 strikeouts in  innings, averaging 12.2 strikeouts per nine innings. He blew seven saves, but struck out 34.4% of batters and lowered his walk rate to a career-best 5.2%, averaging 1.8 walks per nine innings. He limited the first batters he faced to a .100 batting average, the lowest rate in both the AL and in White Sox history.

In his second season as the White Sox closer, Robertson earned 37 saves (fourth in the AL), pitching to a 5–3 record and 3.47 ERA while striking out 75 batters in  innings, averaging 10.8 strikeouts per nine innings. Robertson suffered seven blown saves, with his walk rate rising (4.62 BB/9).

Robertson pitched for the gold-medal-winning Team USA in the 2017 World Baseball Classic.

With the White Sox in rebuilding mode, Robertson became enshrouded in trade rumors during the offseason and regular season. Robertson was nearly traded to the Washington Nationals for Jesus Luzardo and Drew Ward; however, the deal was not completed due to disagreements regarding finances. In 2017 for the White Sox Robertson had a 4–2 record with 13 saves and a 2.70 ERA, and 47 strikeouts in  innings,, averaging 12.8 strikeouts per nine innings, before getting traded to the Yankees.

New York Yankees (2017–2018)

On July 18, 2017, the White Sox traded Robertson, Todd Frazier, and Tommy Kahnle to the New York Yankees for Blake Rutherford, Tyler Clippard, Ian Clarkin, and Tito Polo. In his first appearance after the trade, Robertson struck out the side in the seventh inning to preserve a 5–1 lead against the Seattle Mariners. In the 2017 regular season for the Yankees, he was 5–0 with a save and a 1.03 ERA, and 51 strikeouts in 35 innings, averaging 13.1 strikeouts per nine innings.

He allowed no runs and earned the win.

In 2018, Robertson was 8–3 with five saves, 21 holds (tied for eighth in the AL), and a 3.23 ERA, and 91 strikeouts in a career-high  innings, averaging 11.8 strikeouts per nine innings. His WHIP ranked seventh among AL relievers who pitched at least 60 innings. Batters hit .183 against Robertson. Left-handed batters hit .176 with a .240 on-base percentage against him; both in the top eight among pitchers who faced 130 or more lefties. Pitching against the number 3 and 4 hitters in opposing lineups, he held them to a batting average of .074, as they were 4-for-54 with 22 strikeouts.

Through 2018, in his 11-year career Robertson had a lifetime 2.88 ERA with 137 saves in 654 games pitched (10th among active players). He had averaged 11.97 strikeouts per nine innings, the most of any active pitcher with at least 650 career innings pitched, and had never averaged a season strikeout rate of less than 10.4. He became the only pitcher in major league history to average at least 10 strikeouts/9 innings pitched in each of his first 11 seasons. In his career through 2018, lefties had a .188 batting average and a .546 on-base plus slugging (OPS) against him, and righties had a .222 batting average and a .667 OPS.  He was one of 12 pitchers in American League history to appear in 60 games in nine consecutive seasons. He received the Thurman Munson Award in 2018.

Philadelphia Phillies (2019–2020)
As a free agent, Robertson self-negotiated and signed a two-year, $23 million contract, which included a third-year $12 million club option and $2 million buyout, with the Philadelphia Phillies on January 3, 2019. He donated one percent of his salary to the Phillies' charity fund.

Robertson made his Phillies pitching debut on March 28, 2019, at Citizens Bank Park, against the visiting Atlanta Braves. In 2019, he did not appear in a game after April 14 due to a Grade 1 flexor strain in his pitching elbow; it was determined later that it required season-ending Tommy John surgery. In 2019, he was 0–1 with a 5.40 ERA, pitching 6 innings in seven games. Robertson underwent surgery on August 17, 2019. As of the end of the 2019 season, his career 661 games pitched were eighth-most of all active major league pitchers.

On August 28, 2020, Robertson suffered a setback during his recovery from Tommy John surgery and was immediately shut down from throwing, effectively ending his season without making an appearance. His option was bought out after the season, making him a free agent.

High Point Rockers and Tampa Bay Rays (2021)
On July 12, 2021, Robertson signed with the High Point Rockers of the Atlantic League of Professional Baseball, to help prepare for the 2020 Summer Olympics (contested in 2021). He pitched with the team from July 13 to July 15, earning a win and not allowing a run in two appearances out of the bullpen. 

Following the Olympics, Robertson signed with the Tampa Bay Rays on August 16, 2021. Robertson made his major league season debut on September 1, 2021 with the Rays.

Chicago Cubs (2022)
On March 16, 2022, Robertson signed a one-year contract with the Chicago Cubs. On June 22, 2022, Robertson got his first Major League Baseball at bat, in his 696th game, borrowing gear from his teammates. Though he struck out, he is quoted as saying, "made my dream come true”.

Philadelphia Phillies (2022)
On August 2, 2022, the Cubs traded Robertson to the Philadelphia Phillies in exchange for pitcher Ben Brown.

In 2022 between both teams he was 4–3 with 20 saves (8th in the NL) in 58 games and a 2.40 ERA in 63.2 innings in which he struck out 81 batters. His 731 career games played were 8th-most of all active pitchers, as were his 157 career saves.

New York Mets
On December 9, 2022, Robertson signed a one-year contract with the New York Mets.

International career
Robertson played for the champion United States national baseball team at the 2017 World Baseball Classic, getting the final outs against Puerto Rico in the gold medal game. Robertson and Robinson Cano are the only Yankees to win both a World Series and a World Baseball Classic.

In May 2021, Robertson was named to the roster of the national team for qualifying for baseball at the 2020 Summer Olympics. After the team qualified, he was named to the Olympics roster on July 2. The team went on to win silver, falling to Japan in the gold-medal game.

Pitching style
Robertson's main off-speed pitch is a curveball in the low 80s. Infrequently, he throws a circle changeup to left-handed hitters in the mid-high 80s. Although Robertson's fastball speed is not unusually high, his long stride toward home plate during his delivery appears to "add"  to his fastball by shortening the ball's time in flight. His fastball also has a "natural cut" to it, making it appear as if he is throwing a cut fastball.

Robertson has always had a high walk rate (about one every two to three innings over his career), but this is mitigated by an outstanding strikeout rate; Robertson has averaged at least one strikeout per inning in every year of his career so far. His high strikeout rate has proved useful in critical late-inning situations — in 2011, Robertson struck out 14 of the 19 hitters he faced with the bases loaded and allowed only one hit. His ability to get out of jams has earned him the nickname "Houdini".

Personal life

His brother, Connor, formerly played for the Oakland Athletics and the Arizona Diamondbacks.
Robertson married Erin Cronin in 2009. They have two children, a son born in August 2012, and a daughter born in July 2017. The family resides in Barrington, Rhode Island.

Robertson and his wife started a charitable foundation called "High Socks for Hope" to help the victims of Robertson's hometown of Tuscaloosa, Alabama, deal with the tornado strikes in 2011. Robertson agreed to donate $100 for every strikeout he recorded in the season. For his work, Robertson was nominated for the 2011 Marvin Miller Man of the Year Award. Following the death of his former White Sox teammate Daniel Webb, Robertson set up a fundraiser for Webb's family through High Socks for Hope.

See also

List of baseball players who underwent Tommy John surgery

References

External links

David and Erin Robertson's Foundation: "High Socks For Hope"

1985 births
Living people
Alabama Crimson Tide baseball players
American League All-Stars
Baseball players at the 2020 Summer Olympics
Baseball players from Birmingham, Alabama
Charleston RiverDogs players
Chicago Cubs players
Chicago White Sox players
Major League Baseball pitchers
New York Yankees players
Philadelphia Phillies players
Scranton/Wilkes-Barre Yankees players
Tampa Bay Rays players
Tampa Yankees players
Trenton Thunder players
World Baseball Classic players of the United States
Yarmouth–Dennis Red Sox players
2017 World Baseball Classic players
United States national baseball team players
Olympic baseball players of the United States
Medalists at the 2020 Summer Olympics
Olympic silver medalists for the United States in baseball